Frederick Polhill (2 July 1798 – 20 September 1848) was a British Conservative and Tory politician.

Polhill first became a Tory Member of Parliament (MP) for Bedford at the 1830 general election, and held the seat until the 1832 general election when he was defeated. He returned to the seat at the 1835 general election as a Conservative and held it until 1847, when he was again defeated.

References

External links
 

UK MPs 1830–1831
UK MPs 1831–1832
UK MPs 1835–1837
UK MPs 1837–1841
UK MPs 1841–1847
Conservative Party (UK) MPs for English constituencies
Tory MPs (pre-1834)
1798 births
1848 deaths